U of M School of Law may refer to:
 University of Maine School of Law, Portland, Maine
 University of Maryland School of Law, Baltimore, Maryland
 University of Massachusetts School of Law, Dartmouth, Massachusetts
 University of Miami School of Law, Coral Gables, Floria
 University of Michigan Law School, Ann Arbor, Michigan
 University of Minnesota Law School, Minneapolis, Minnesota
 University of Mississippi School of Law, Oxford, Mississippi
 University of Missouri School of Law, Columbia, Missouri
 University of Montana School of Law, Missoula, Montana